Westphalia Township is a township in Shelby County, Iowa. There are 712 people and 19.5 people per square mile in Westphalia Township. The total area is 36.5 square miles.

References

Townships in Shelby County, Iowa
Townships in Iowa